Fadanuf Fa Erybody!! is the debut studio album by American hip hop trio Odd Squad (now known as the Coughee Brothaz), consists of Devin the Dude, Jugg Mugg and Rob Quest. It was released on February 1, 1994 through Rap-A-Lot Records with distribution via Priority Records. Production was handled by Carlos "DJ Styles" Garza and Rob Quest with N.O. Joe and Mike Dean.

The project's loose party atmosphere is further represented on the cover artwork, which is a light parody of Ernie Barnes’ famous painting The Sugar Shack; the latter is best known for its inclusion on the cover of late, great soul legend Marvin Gaye's 1976 album I Want You, and was additionally parodied by retro-blaxploitation hip hop innovators Camp Lo on their classic 1997 debut album Uptown Saturday Night.

It was on the Top R&B/Hip-Hop Albums chart for 3 weeks, peaking at #66. Rap-A-Lot called it Scarface's best release. Despite high praise from the label, the album would receive little promotion besides three dates opening for Scarface.

Rob Quest is blind. Fadanuf Fa Erybody!! features a song called "I Can't See It" where he pokes lighthearted fun at his blindness.

Track listing

References

External links

1994 debut albums
Devin the Dude albums
Rap-A-Lot Records albums
Albums produced by N.O. Joe
Odd Squad (hip-hop group) albums
Albums produced by Mike Dean (record producer)